The West Kootenay League, also referred to as the West Kootenay Hockey League (WKHL), is a defunct senior men's ice hockey league that operated in eastern British Columbia from 1922–1941, and also during the 1945-46 season. In 1946-47 the league expanded to Spokane and Los Angeles and became the Western International Hockey League.

In its 20 years of operation, the West Kootenay League won every British Columbia Senior Championship (Savage Cup) after its first season (1922–23) and teams from this league won the Allan Cup twice.

History
The West Kootenay League operated from 1922–23 through 1940–41. Many of the players resisted the idea of turning professional because, with the promise of high paying mining jobs, they had secure jobs for life and were making as much, if not more, than players in the NHL.

In 1931 the Kimberley Dynamiters joined the West Kootenay League, and this began an immediate rivalry with the always strong Trail Smoke Eaters, a true powerhouse of senior British Columbia hockey.

In 1941 the league suspended operations for three seasons due to World War II, and its teams merged with the Alberta Senior League to become the Alberta-British Columbia Senior League for the 1941–42 season. The West Kootenay League was resurrected for the 1945–46 season, and in 1946–47 the league expanded to Spokane and Los Angeles and became the Western International Hockey League.

List of champions
 1922–23 Nelson Hockey Club
 1923–24 Rossland Miners
 1924–25 Trail Hockey Club
 1925–26 Trail Hockey Club
 1926–27 Trail Hockey Club
 1927–28 Trail Hockey Club
 1928–29 Trail Smoke Eaters
 1929–30 Trail Smoke Eaters
 1930–31 Trail Smoke Eaters
 1931–32 Trail Smoke Eaters
 1932–33 Trail Smoke Eaters
 1933–34 Kimberley Dynamiters
 1934–35 Kimberley Dynamiters
 1935–36 Kimberley Dynamiters (won the Allan Cup)
 1936–37 Nelson Maple Leafs
 1937–38 Trail Smoke Eaters (won the Allan Cup)
 1938–39 Kimberley Dynamiters
 1939–40 Trail Smoke Eaters
 1940–41 Trail Smoke Eaters
 1945–46 Trail Smoke Eaters

References

   
Defunct ice hockey leagues in British Columbia
1922 establishments in British Columbia
1947 disestablishments in British Columbia
Sports leagues established in 1922
Sports leagues disestablished in 1947